The Canton of Aubusson is a canton situated in the Creuse département and in the Nouvelle-Aquitaine region, in central France.

Geography 
A farming and woodland area, with the town of Aubusson, in the arrondissement of Aubusson, at its centre. The altitude varies from 396m (Alleyrat) to 715m (Saint-Marc-à-Frongier) with an average altitude of 538m.

Composition 
At the French canton reorganisation which came into effect in March 2015, the canton was expanded from 10 to 21 communes:
 
Alleyrat
Aubusson
Bellegarde-en-Marche
Blessac
Bosroger
Champagnat
La Chaussade
Lupersat
Mainsat
Mautes
Néoux
Saint-Alpinien
Saint-Amand
Saint-Avit-de-Tardes
Saint-Domet
Saint-Maixant
Saint-Marc-à-Frongier
Saint-Pardoux-le-Neuf
Saint-Silvain-Bellegarde
Saint-Sulpice-les-Champs
La Serre-Bussière-Vieille

Population

See also 
 Arrondissements of the Creuse department
 Cantons of the Creuse department
 Communes of the Creuse department

References

Aubusson